Andrew 'Andy' Mark Eisen, (born in 1969 in Las Vegas, Nevada) is an American politician and a Democratic former member of the Nevada Assembly from 2012 until 2014, representing District 21.

Education
Eisen earned his BS and MD from Northwestern University Medical School (now Feinberg School of Medicine).

Elections
2012 When Republican Assemblyman Mark Sherwood left the legislature after one term and left the District 21 seat open, Eisen won the three-way June 12, 2012 Democratic Primary with 684 votes (39.54%) and won the three-way November 6, 2012 General election with 12,123 votes (50.07%) against Republican nominee Becky Harris and Independent American candidate Les McKay (who had run for the seat in 2008).
Eisen was defeated by Republican Derek Armstrong 50-46% in 2014.

References

External links
Official page at the Nevada Legislature
Campaign site
 

Date of birth missing (living people)
1969 births
Living people
Feinberg School of Medicine alumni
Democratic Party members of the Nevada Assembly
People from the Las Vegas Valley